Sir Alan Cockshaw  (born 14 July 1937) is an English civil engineer.  Born in Manchester, he became the chief executive of Fairclough Civil Engineering in 1978 and, when this merged with the William Press Group to form AMEC in 1982, he became the chief executive (1984–88) and then chairman (1988-97). He was knighted in 1992.  He became a fellow of the Royal Academy of Engineering in 1986 and was president of the Institution of Civil Engineers from 1997 to 1998. He is a member of the South Tees Development Corporation board.

References

Presidents of the Institution of Civil Engineers
1937 births
Living people
English civil engineers
Knights Bachelor
Businesspeople awarded knighthoods
21st-century British engineers
20th-century British engineers